Henri Chapu (1833–1891) was a French sculptor.

Chapu was born in Le Mée-sur-Seine on 30 September 1833. He trained at the École Gratuite de Dessin as a tapestry maker. In 1849 his successes led him to the École des Beaux-Arts, Paris, where he became a pupil of James Pradier, François Duret and Léon Cogniet. In 1855 he won the Prix de Rome for sculpture with the relief "Cleobis and Biton".  He completed his education at the Académie de France in Rome, remaining there until 1861.  While there, he worked in the Villa Médicis.  During the period of the Second Empire and the Third Republic, Chapu worked on the sculptural decoration of many buildings and public monuments, including the decoration of the façade of the Au Printemps store, the Théâtre de l'Opéra, and the gardens of the Château de Chantilly.  Many of Chapu's works take the form of médallions and he is credited with having led a new wave of interest in this medium.

In 1867 Chapu was made a chevalier of the Légion d'honneur, in recognition of his works for the Éxposition Universelle of that year, and in 1880 he was elected to the Academie des Beaux-Arts.  He died on 21 April 1891 and is buried in Mée-sur-Seine's cemetery.

Key

Works

Gallery

External links

Fidière's biography " Chapu, sa vie et son oeuvre" published in Paris in 1894:  
 Fidière's biography of Chapu.

References

Chapu, Henri
Chapu, Henri